Avdeyevskaya is a rural locality (a village) in Yaromzhskoye Rural Settlement of Cherepovetsky District, Vologda Oblast, Russia. The population was 14 as of 2002. There is 1 street.

Geography 
Avdeyevskaya is located 26 km north of Cherepovets (the district's administrative centre) by road. Ramenye is the nearest rural locality.

References 

Rural localities in Cherepovetsky District